Nagpur East Assembly constituency is one of the 288 Vidhan Sabha (legislative assembly) constituencies of Maharashtra state, western India. It is one of the six assembly seats which make up  Nagpur Lok Sabha seat. The Constituency Number is 54. This constituency is located in the Nagpur district. The delimitation of the constituency happened in 2008. It comprises part of Nagpur Taluka and Ward No. 6 to 8, 28 to 36, and 67 to 72 of Nagpur Municipal Corporation.

List of Members of Legislative Assembly

References

Politics of Nagpur
Assembly constituencies of Nagpur district
Assembly constituencies of Maharashtra